Umaru Shehu (born 8 December 1930) is a Nigerian Professor of Medicine who served as the 11th Vice Chancellor of the University of Nigeria, Nsukka. He is a Professor Emeritus, Community health, University of Maiduguri and former President of the Nigerian Academy of Science.

Professor Umaru received a Bachelor of Medicine degree, MBBS from the University of London.

He is the first head of department, Department of Community medicine ABU Zaria; former vice-chancellor of the University of Nigeria Nsukka; former sole administrator of the University of Maiduguri; former Pro-chancellor and chairman governing council Bayero University Kano and University of Lagos; professor emeritus, community health, university of Maiduguri; former president of the Nigerian Academy of Science and former president, medical schools in Africa.

Shehu receiving the Centenary award from President Goodluck Jonathan.

Shehu bagged his first degree in Medicine, (MBBS), from the University of London and capped the feat with a fellowship of the institute of cancer research while serving as the editor-in-chief of the ''British Medical.

Shehu started work as a Pre-registration house surgeon, Southport infirmary, the United Kingdom in 1957. He returned back to Nigeria and served the government of Northern Nigeria as pre-registration house physician, same year, and was promoted to the rank of medical officer, from 1957-1963; senior medical officer, from 1963-1965; principal medical officer, from 1965-1966; assistant chief medical officer, from 1966-1967 and chief medical officer, (Preventive Services Division), from 1967-1968.

He was then redeployed to North-Eastern State as permanent secretary, ministry of health and chief medical officer, an offer he declined and moved to Ahmadu Bello University Zaria to take up appointment as reader and acting head of department of community medicine, from 1968-1970; deputy dean, faculty of medicine, from 1968-1970; acting director, institute of health, from 1969-1970; Professor of community medicine, in 1970.

He became head of department, community medicine, from 1970-1978; director, institute of health, from 1970-1977; deputy vice-chancellor, from 1975-1976; Pro vice-chancellor (Academic), from 1977-1978. The professor held visiting professorships in various universities, including the school of medicine, University of North Carolina at Chapel Hill, USA, from 1976-1977.

Shehu was appointed vice chancellor, university of Nigeria, Nsukka, from 1978-1980. He also worked with the World Health Organization (WHO) as short term consultant, (working group on health services and manpower development mechanism) in Geneva, in September, 1970; appointed temporary adviser, in October, 1970; short-term consultant, from 1971-1973; consultant (Technical Discussions), 24th WHO regional committee for Africa.

He was a national WHO program coordinator/representative in Nigeria, from 1980-1985; director, WHO sub-regional health development office 111, from 1985-1989 and WHO representative to Ethiopia, in 1990. At the University of Maiduguri, Shehu was appointed as an honorary consultant physician, from 1991 to date, and became Professor Emeritus in 2000.

He was also the provost, college of medical sciences, from 1991-1993 and became the sole administrator of the university of Maiduguri, from 1993-1994. At the university college hospital Ibadan, Shehu was appointed the chairman, board of management, from 1991-1994.

At Bayero university, Kano, he was appointed Pro-chancellor and chairman governing council, from 1993-1996, and also doubles as Pro-chancellor and chairman governing council of the university of Lagos, from 1996-1999. He served as a member of several committees, councils, panels and commissions at both national and international levels.

Shehu was president of medical schools in Africa, from 1973-1975; and an external examiner in public health, university of Ghana medical school. He is the current chairman board of governors of the STOPAIDS organization; chairman governing board of the National Agency for the Control of AIDS, (NACA).

He also received a fellowship of the Institute of Cancer Research.

References

1930 births
Living people
Fellows of the Nigerian Academy of Science
Vice-Chancellors of the University of Nigeria
Nigerian medical doctors
Kanuri people
People from Maiduguri
Academic staff of the University of Nigeria